Sir Ronald Walter Radford, KCB, MBE (28 February 1916 – 3 September 1995) was an English civil servant. Educated at St John's College, Cambridge, he entered the Indian Civil Service in 1939 and remained there until Indian Independence in 1947. He then entered HM Customs and Excise as an assistant principal. Promoted to be a Commissioner of Customs and Excise in 1965, he was chairman of the board from 1973 to 1977. He was then secretary-general of the Customs Cooperation Council from 1978 to 1983.

References 

1916 births
1995 deaths
English civil servants
Alumni of St John's College, Cambridge
Knights Companion of the Order of the Bath
Members of the Order of the British Empire
Indian Civil Service (British India) officers